Tomm Murstad (2 July 1915 – 19 January 2001) was a Norwegian skier, coach and business man.

He was born in Fredrikstad as a son of physician Hjalmar Murstad (1883–1940) and Elisabeth Korneliussen (1887–1968). He grew up at Vinderen. He was married to  Nathalia "Oja" Mustad, daughter of Hans Clarin Hovind Mustad and granddaughter of Hans Mustad, from 1941 to 1969, and then to Nena Gretta Godfrey from 1970.

Murstad began skiing as a youngster, with emphasis on alpine skiing and ski jumping. He eventually became an alpine skiing instructor in France, and spent summers at the Riviera where he held water skiing shows. In late 1934 he opened a skiing school in Marka, Oslo. During the following years he traveled between Norway, France and United States to stage shows, go on public relation tours and run the skiing school. In the United States he visited New York City, Boston and Chicago, where 100,000 people attended his indoor ski jumping hill shows.

During World War II his skiing school was closed. After the war he opened ski schools for children near Tryvann in Norway. The children were brought there from downtown Oslo in a separate tram car, embarking from Majorstua station. Ahead of the 1952 Winter Olympics he was the coach of Norway's alpine skiing team. The team included Stein Eriksen, who later joined Murstad in summertime water skiing shows. Murstad also ran a sports clothing store. In 1960 he started an eponymous summer camp for youths, with emphasis on water sports and maritime safety. He used the moniker "Onkel Tomm", a direct translation of Uncle Tom.

In 1980 he was decorated with the HM The King's Medal of Merit in gold. He died in January 2001 in Oslo. His ventures are now run by Tomm Murstad, Jr.

References

1915 births
2001 deaths
Businesspeople from Oslo
Sportspeople from Fredrikstad
Norwegian expatriates in France
Norwegian male alpine skiers
Norwegian male ski jumpers
Norwegian sports coaches
Alpine skiing coaches
Norwegian Olympic coaches
20th-century Norwegian businesspeople
Recipients of the King's Medal of Merit in gold